Lifjell  is a hill in the municipality of Kongsberg in Buskerud, Norway.

References

External links
Map of Lifjell in Kongsberg

Kongsberg
Mountains of Viken